Roger Paul Morin (March 7, 1941 – October 31, 2019) was an American prelate of the Roman Catholic Church. He was the third Bishop of Biloxi. Pope Francis accepted his resignation on December 16, 2016.

Early life and education
Roger Morin was born in Lowell, Massachusetts, to Germain and Lillian Morin; he has two brothers, James and Paul, and three sisters, Lillian, Elaine, and Susan. He was a native of Dracut and was a communicant of Ste-Thérèse Parish. He attended St. John's Seminary in Brighton, from where he obtained a bachelor's degree in philosophy in 1966, and then pursued his graduate studies in theology there for two years.

In 1968, he became director of The Center in New Orleans, Louisiana, a social service organization run by the Roman Catholic Archdiocese of New Orleans, having previously worked in the archdiocese's summer Witness program. He entered Notre Dame Seminary that same year, earning a Master's in Divinity in 1970.

Priesthood
Morin was ordained to the priesthood on April 15, 1971, and then served as an associate pastor at St. Henry's Church in New Orleans. He received a Master of Science degree in urban affairs from Tulane University in 1974, and became director of the Archdiocesan Social Apostolate in 1975.

From 1978 to 1981, at the request of Mayor Ernest Morial, he served as a volunteer special assistant in the office of the mayor, dealing with federal programs and projects. In 1981, Morin was named archdiocesan vicar for community affairs and parochial vicar of Incarnate Word Church in New Orleans, later serving as its pastor from 1988 to 2002. He was raised to the rank of monsignor in 1985, and organized preparations for Pope John Paul II's visit to New Orleans in 1987. He was named vicar general and moderator of the curia for the archdiocese in 2001.

Episcopal career
On February 11, 2003, Morin was appointed auxiliary bishop of New Orleans and titular bishop of Aulon by John Paul II. He received his episcopal consecration on the following April 22 from Archbishop Alfred Hughes, with Archbishops Philip Hannan and Francis Schulte serving as co-consecrators. He selected as his episcopal motto, "Walk Humbly and Act Justly."

Within the United States Conference of Catholic Bishops, Morin has served as chairman of the Subcommittee of the Catholic Campaign for Human Development, and as a member of the Committee on Domestic Justice and Human Development and the Committee on National Collections.

Bishop of Biloxi
Morin was later named the third Bishop of Biloxi, Mississippi, by Pope Benedict XVI on March 2, 2009. He succeeded Thomas John Rodi, who was promoted to Archbishop of Mobile in April 2008. He was formally installed at the Cathedral of the Nativity of the Blessed Virgin Mary on the following April 27; the papal bull of appointment that is customarily read at a bishop's installation did not arrive by the time of Morin's own installation.

As Bishop of Biloxi, Morin was the spiritual leader of 68,000 Catholics in southern Mississippi.

Bishop Morin died on October 31, 2019.

See also
 

 Catholic Church hierarchy
 Catholic Church in the United States
 Historical list of the Catholic bishops of the United States
 List of Catholic bishops of the United States
 Lists of patriarchs, archbishops, and bishops

References

External links
Diocese of Biloxi

Episcopal succession

1941 births
2019 deaths
21st-century Roman Catholic bishops in the United States
Notre Dame Seminary alumni
People from Lowell, Massachusetts
Roman Catholic Diocese of Biloxi
Saint John's Seminary (Massachusetts) alumni
Tulane University alumni
Roman Catholic bishops in Mississippi
Catholics from Massachusetts